The Virginia House-Wife is an 1824 housekeeping manual and cookbook by Mary Randolph. In addition to recipes it gave instructions for making soap, starch, blacking and cologne.

Publication history 
The Virginia House-Wife was first published in 1824; it was republished at least nineteen times before the outbreak of the Civil War. The book was 225 pages long, included nearly 500 recipes, and resulted from Randolph's "practical experience as keeper of a large establishment, and perhaps in the hope of further augmenting the family income." The Virginia House-Wife is considered the first regional American cookbook.

Contents 
According to historian Cynthia A. Kierner, "Randolph presented a southern — specifically, a Virginian — model for southern readers. Although her occasional explanations of uniquely southern foods suggests she anticipated an audience beyond her region, [Randolph's work] appealed to the women of the rural South who were the majority of her readers."

Randolph's recipes exhibited a uniquely Virginian style, using Virginia produce for dishes influenced by African, Native American, and European foods.  The book included recipes for Southern classics such as okra, sweet potatoes, biscuits, fried chicken, barbecue shote (young pig), and lemonade. European influenced recipes included gazpacho, ropa vieja, polenta, and macaroni.  Six curry recipes were included in The Virginia House-Wife; these were the first curry recipes published in the United States and suggest curry was already a popular seasoning in the region. Specialties from other parts of the US included a recipe entitled "Dough Nuts - A Yankee Cake."  The Virginia House-Wife also included the first ice cream recipe published by an American author. In addition to recipes the book also explained how to make soap, starch, blacking and cologne.

Conventional wisdom has claimed that early Americans ate few vegetables and overcooked the few they did eat. The Virginia House-Wife gives recipes for dozens of vegetables and seventeen aromatic herbs. This dietary diversity can be confirmed with Thomas Jefferson's notes on the produce for sale in Washington's markets. Randolph specifically recommended short cooking times for asparagus and spinach; Karen Hess points out that overcooking didn't become common until canning became a popular method of preservation in the mid-nineteenth century.

Modern analysis 
Although Randolph was a knowledgeable cook, the majority of the labor in her kitchen was done by black women.  While it is impossible to speculate on Randolph's relationship to these women, Melissa Blank of Colonial Williamsburg sees "evidence that enslaved cooks had a significant influence on how Mary prepared food." Karen Hess's introduction to the 1984 edition of the Virginia housewife notes "The black presence was infinitely more subtle in Virginia cookery than in that of New Orleans or the West Indies, but ... the culture was sufficiently imbued with it to condition the palate of the entire community.  Hess cites gumbo, eggplant, field peas, yams and possibly tomatoes as crops that accompanied enslaved Black people to the Americas.  Hess also notes the West Indies forged a connection between Spanish, French, Creole, and Southern cooking.

See also 

 Oyster ice cream, a recipe included in the cookbook

References

Further reading 

 Brewer, Priscilla J. From Fireplace to Cookstove: Technology and the Domestic Ideal in America. Syracuse: Syracuse University Press, 2000.
 Camp, Charles. American Foodways: What, When, Why, and How We Eat in America. Little Rock, AR: August House, 1989.
 Carroll, Abigail. Three Squares: The Invention of the American Meal. New York: Basic Books, 2013.
 Dalby, Andrew. Dangerous Tastes: The Story of Spices. Berkeley, CA: The University of California Press, 2000.
 Davidson, Alan. The Penguin Companion to American Food and Drink. New York: The Penguin Group, 1999, 2002.
 Diamond, Becky. Mrs. Goodfellow: The Story of America’s First Cooking School. Yardley, PA: Westholme Publishing, 2012.
 Driver, Elizabeth. “Cookbooks as Primary Sources for Writing History.” Food, Culture, and Society 12, no. 3 (2009): 257-274.
 Floyd, Janet and Laurel Forster, eds. The Recipe Reader: Narratives – Contexts – Traditions. Burlington, VT: Ashgate, 2003.
 Humble, Nicola. Cake: A Global History. London: Reaktion Books Ltd., 2010.
 Hunter, Lynette. “Nineteenth- and Twentieth-Century Trends in Food Preserving: Frugality, Nutrition or Luxury.” In ‘Waste Not, Want Not’: Food Preservation from Early Times to the Present Day, edited by C. Anne Wilson, 134-158. Edinburgh: Edinburgh University Press, 1991.
 Inness, Sherrie A. “Introduction: Thinking Food/Thinking Gender.” In Kitchen Culture in America: Popular Representations of Food, Gender, and Race, edited by Sherrie A. Inness, 1-12. Philadelphia: University of Pennsylvania Press, 2001.
 Ireland, Lynne. “The Compiled Cookbooks as Foodways Autobiography.” Western Folklore 40, no. 1 (1981): 107-114.
 Krondl, Michael. Sweet Invention: A History of Dessert. Chicago: Chicago Review Press, 2011.
 Leavitt, Sarah A. From Catharine Beecher to Martha Stewart: A Cultural History of Domestic Advice. Chapel Hill: University of North Carolina Press, 2002.
 Leonardi, Susan J.  “Recipes for Reading: Summer Pasta, Lobster àla Riseholme, and Key Lime Pie.” PMLA 104, no. 3 (1989): 340-347.
 Mariani, John F.  The Encyclopedia of American Food and Drink. New York: Bloomsbury, 2013.
 McWilliams, James E. A Revolution in Eating: How the Quest for Food Shaped America. New York: Columbia University Press, 2005.
 Mintz, Sidney W.  Sweetness and Power: The Place of Sugar in Modern History. New York: Viking Penguin, Inc., 1985.
 Moss, Kay K. Seeking the Historical Cook: Exploring Eighteenth-Century Southern Foodways. Columbia: University of South Carolina Press, 2013.
 Oliver, Sandra L. Food in Colonial and Federal America. Westport, CT: Greenwood Press, 2005.
 _. Saltwater Foodways: New Englanders and their Food, at Sea and Ashore, in the Nineteenth Century. Mystic, CT: Mystic Seaport Museum, Inc., 1995.
 Shapiro, Laura. Perfection Salad: Women and Cooking at the Turn of the Century. New York: Farrar, Straus, and Giroux, 1986.
 Smith, Andrew F., ed.  The Oxford Companion to American Food and Drink. Oxford and New York: Oxford University Press, 2007.
 Smith, Merril D. History of American Cooking. Santa Barbara, CA: ABC-CLIO Inc., 2013.
 Stavely, Keith and Kathleen Fitzgerald. America’s Founding Food: The Story of New England Cooking. Chapel Hill: The University of North Carolina Press, 2004.
 _. Northern Hospitality: Cooking by the Book in New England. Amherst and Boston: University of Massachusetts Press, 2011.
 Theopano, Janet. Eat My Words: Reading Women’s Lives through the Cookbooks They Wrote. New York: Palgrave, 2002.
 Tipton-Martin, Toni. The Jemima Code: Two Centuries of African American Cookbooks. Austin, TX: University of Texas Press, 2015.
 Turner, Jack. Spice: The History of a Temptation. New York: Alfred A. Knopf, 2004.
 Tye, Diane. Baking as Biography: A Life Story in Recipes. Montreal & Kingston: McGill-Queen’s University Press, 2010.
 Veit, Helen Zoe, ed. Food in the Civil War Era: The South. East Lansing: Michigan State University Press, 2014.
 Wheaton, Barbara Ketcham. “Cookbooks as Resources for Social History,” In Food in Time and Place: The American Historical Association to Food History, edited by Paul Freedman, Joyce E. Chaplin, and Ken Albala, 276-299. Berkeley: University of California Press, 2014.
 _. Savoring the Past: The French Kitchen and Table from 1300-1789. Philadelphia: University of Pennsylvania Press, 1983.
 Williams, Susan. Food in the United States, 1820s-1890. Westport, CT: Greenwood Press, 2006.
 Wilson, C. Anne, ed. ‘Waste Not, Want Not’: Food Preservation from Early Times to the Present Day. Edinburgh: Edinburgh University Press, 1991.
 Wilson, Mary Tolford. “Amelia Simmons Fills a Need: American Cookery, 1796.” The William and Mary Quarterly 14, no. 1 (1957): 16-30.

External links 

 The Virginia Housewife: or, Methodical Cook.  Baltimore: 1838. at Feeding America
 The Virginia Housewife: or, Methodical Cook. Baltimore: 1836. at Internet Archive

1824 books
American cookbooks
American cuisine